Walter Weaver (9 November 1898 – 1965) was an English professional association footballer who played as a winger.

References

1898 births
1965 deaths
Sportspeople from Birkenhead
English footballers
Association football wingers
Burnley F.C. players
Everton F.C. players
Wolverhampton Wanderers F.C. players
English Football League players